Southern District Council is the district council for the Southern District in Hong Kong. It is one of 18 such councils. The Southern District Council currently consists of 17 members, of which the district is divided into 17 constituencies, electing a total of 17 members. The last election was held on 24 November 2019.

History
The Southern District Council was established on 4 December 1981 under the name of the Southern District Board as the result of the colonial Governor Murray MacLehose's District Administration Scheme reform. The District Board was partly elected with the ex-officio Urban Council members, as well as members appointed by the Governor until 1994 when last Governor Chris Patten refrained from appointing any member.

The Southern District Board became Southern Provisional District Board after the Hong Kong Special Administrative Region (HKSAR) was established in 1997 with the appointment system being reintroduced by Chief Executive Tung Chee-hwa. The Southern District Council was established on 1 January 2000 after the first District Council election in 1999. The council has become fully elected when the appointed seats were abolished in 2011 after the modified constitutional reform proposal was passed by the Legislative Council in 2010.

The Southern District Council has been dominated by the conservative independents. It was once the stronghold of the traditional political group Hong Kong Civic Association in the 1980s, in which they received a great victory in the 1985 election and elected its member Lam Kwok-kwong as the board chairman. The Hong Kong Civic Association allied with the conservative Liberal Democratic Federation of Hong Kong (LDF) in the 1991 election, while the liberal United Democrats of Hong Kong (UDHK) also established its presence in the district concentrated in Wah Fu Estate, led by Huang Chen-ya who was later elected to the Legislative Council in the same year.

The Southern District Council has been controlled by the pro-Beijing camp since 1997, even though the Democratic Party maintained their presence in Wah Fu and some other constituencies. It also bred its young party members Lo Kin-hei and Au Nok-hin who both took the Lei Tung constituencies away from long-held conservative independent councillors in the 2011 election. In the 2019 elections, the pro-democrats achieved the majority in the council in a historic landslide victory brought by the pro-democracy protests. Kelvin Lam Ho-por, a substitute for Joshua Wong who was disqualified from running, defeated Judy Chan Ka-pui of the New People's Party in South Horizons West.

Political control
Since 1982 political control of the council has been held by the following parties:

Political makeup

Elections are held every four years.

District result maps

Members represented
Starting from 1 January 2020:

Leadership

Chairs
Since 1985, the chairman is elected by all the members of the board:

Vice Chairs

Notes

References

 
Districts of Hong Kong
Southern District, Hong Kong
District Councils of Hong Kong